USS Saratoga may refer to the following United States Navy warships:

 , an 18-gun sloop-of-war launched in 1780; lost at sea the following year
 , a 26-gun corvette built on Lake Champlain for service in the War of 1812
 , a 22-gun sloop-of-war; commissioned 1843; served until 1888
 , a later name for the armored cruiser 
 , a never-completed  converted into an aircraft carrier
 , a  commissioned in 1927; active in World War II; was sunk by atomic bomb test in 1946
 , a  supercarrier; commissioned 1956; decommissioned 1994

See also
 , a United States Army transport ship in World War I

United States Navy ship names